The 1986 Sabah state election was held between Sunday, 4 May and Monday, 5 May 1986. The snap election was called by chief minister Pairin Kitingan in response to civil disturbances and political defections following the results of the 1985 state election. 

The election was won by Pairin's Parti Bersatu Sabah which kept all its seats and gained 9 more (4 from USNO, 4 from Berjaya and the only seat held by Pasok). Berjaya lost all 6 seats it held (4 to PBS, 1 to USNO and 1 to SCCP) but gained one new seat from USNO. USNO had a net loss of 4 seats (losing 4 to PBS and exchanging 1 with Berjaya).

Results

Aftermath
The SCCP candidate who has won in the election, quit his party and joined PBS 2 days after the election. This was the final state election SCCP participates, as the party were dissolved before the 1990 state election.

Pairin was sworn in as Chief Minister on the next day after the election results, together with the state EXCO members. Pairin also announces PBS are joining Barisan Nasional as component party on the same day.

References

Sabah state elections
Sabah